Puka Urqu (Quechua puka red, urqu mountain,) "red mountain", Hispanicized spelling Puca Orjo) is a mountain in the Wansu mountain range in the Andes of Peru, about  high. It is situated in the Apurímac Region, Antabamba Province, Antabamba District. Paychi lies northwest of Paqu Qhawana and north of Yana Ranra.

References 

Mountains of Peru
Mountains of Apurímac Region